The Scorpions de Mulhouse is a French ice hockey team, based in Mulhouse, France, run by the Association pour le développement du hockey mulhousien (English: Mulhousian Association for the development of hockey). They currently play in the Ligue Magnus, the highest level of French ice hockey having gained promotion from FFHG Division 1 in 2016.

Roster 
Updated February 8, 2019.

References

External links
 Official site

Ice hockey teams in France
Ice hockey clubs established in 2007
2007 establishments in France
Sport in Mulhouse